Diocese of Mysore may mean,
 Roman Catholic Diocese of Mysore,
 Church of South India Diocese of Mysore, trifurcated into,
 Church of South India Karnataka Northern Diocese
 Church of South India Karnataka Central Diocese
 Church of South India Karnataka Southern Diocese